Michael Küchmeister von Sternberg (1360 or 1370 – 15 December 1423, Danzig (Gdańsk)) was the 28th Grand Master of the Teutonic Knights, serving from 1414 to 1422.

Biography 
Küchmeister was born in Silesia, as a son of Saxon nobility. He was the procurator of Rastenburg (Rastembork) (1396–1402) and the Großschäffer of Königsberg (1402–05). After the Peace of Raciąż of 1404 he held the position of Vogt of Samogitia and from 1410 the Vogt of the Neumark (Nowy Targ).  After the Battle of Grunwald, he tried with his army of mercenaries and vassals to re-take the regions lost by the Teutonic Order. In September 1410, Küchmeister lost the Battle of Koronowo and was captured by the Polish army, and was not released from prison until the summer of 1411. The defeat prompted the signing of the Peace of Thorn (1411).

In the aftermath of the defeat at Grunwald, the Teutonic Order lost much of its military and economic importance. The way of thinking of the Old Prussians had changed as well. It was not surprising that when Grand Master Heinrich von Plauen was heading towards war with the Kingdom of Poland, his army (consisting of Prussian nobility and villagers) stationed near the village of Lautenburg (Lidzbark Welski) refused to fight the Poles on 29 September 1413, and he was relieved from his position as Grand Master by Küchmeister.

On 7 January 1414 Küchmeister was chosen as the 28th Grand Master of the Teutonic Order. Although he preferred negotiations over war, he strengthened Marienburg Castle (Malbork Castle) with an extra wall on the north side. He resigned in March 1422 before the Gollub War began.

Küchmeister died in Danzig (Gdańsk) and was buried in the mausoleum under the Chapel of St. Anna in Marienburg Castle.

References
 Friedrich Borchert: "Die Hochmeister des Deutschen Ordens in Preußen." In: Preußische Allgemeine Zeitung, 6 October 2001.

14th-century births
1423 deaths
14th-century German nobility
15th-century German nobility
Grand Masters of the Teutonic Order
German untitled nobility
Saxon nobility
Silesian-German people
Burials in the Chapel of St. Anne, Malbork